John G. Truxal (February 19, 1924 - February 16, 2007) was an American control theorist and a Distinguished Teaching Professor, Emeritus at the State University of New York at Stony Brook. Truxal was a member of the National Academy of Engineering and is noted for his numerous contributions to control theory, for which he received the Richard E. Bellman Control Heritage Award (1991). He moved to the Polytechnic Institute of Brooklyn and became professor and chairman of the electrical engineering department there in 1957. Four years later, he was named vice president of the school, and held that position for 11 years.

References

External links
 Purdue University profile
 Biography of John G. Truxal from the Institute for Operations Research and the Management Sciences
 Biography at the Engineering and Technology History Wiki

Control theorists
Richard E. Bellman Control Heritage Award recipients
1924 births
2007 deaths
Polytechnic Institute of New York University faculty
Dartmouth College alumni
Massachusetts Institute of Technology alumni